Andre Agassi defeated the defending champion Yevgeny Kafelnikov in the final, 3–6, 6–3, 6–2, 6–4 to win the men's singles tennis title at the 2000 Australian Open. It was Agassi's fourth consecutive major final, making him the first man to do so since Rod Laver in 1969. With the win, Agassi became the champion at three of the four majors, missing only Wimbledon.

This was the first Australian Open that Roger Federer competed in and the first time he progressed beyond the first round in a major. Also, this marked the beginning of Federer's 65-consecutive major appearance streak and his 21-consecutive Australian Open appearance streak.

This tournament marked former champion Jim Courier's final major appearance.

Seeds

Qualifying

Draw

Finals

Top half

Section 1

Section 2

Section 3

Section 4

Bottom half

Section 5

Section 6

Section 7

Section 8

Singles overview
Men's singles

External links
 Association of Tennis Professionals (ATP) – 2000 Australian Open Men's Singles draw
 2000 Australian Open – Men's draws and results at the International Tennis Federation

 

Mens singles
Australian Open (tennis) by year – Men's singles